State Highway 19 (SH-19) is a state highway in Idaho from the Oregon state line to Interstate 84 (I-84) and U.S. Route 30 (US 30) in Caldwell. SH-19 is signed as an east–west highway.

Route description
Its western terminus is at the Oregon state line; the highway continues west then north as Oregon 201. After passing through Homedale, it is concurrent with US 95 to Wilder. SH-19 then turns east, passing through Greenleaf before ending at I-84 in Caldwell.

History

SH-19 was extended through downtown Caldwell to an interchange with I-84 in 2022 as part of a long-term relinquishment of I-84 Business to the city government.

Major intersections

Connector route

State Highway 19 Connector is a short one-way route connecting SH-19 and I-84 Bus.

See also

 List of state highways in Idaho
 List of highways numbered 19

References

External links

019
Transportation in Owyhee County, Idaho
Transportation in Canyon County, Idaho